St Clair railway station is located on the Outer Harbor line. Situated in the north-western Adelaide suburb of Cheltenham, it is 8.6 kilometres from Adelaide station.

History

Construction of St Clair station began in June 2013, with the station opening on 23 February 2014. It is the official replacement for the Cheltenham Racecourse railway station, which closed in 2009 and was later demolished.

In late 2016, the station was ranked as one of the best stations in the western suburbs based on 5 criteria. The reasons cited included: "Very clean, fine paintwork, no graffiti and no smell. Area well landscaped."

Services by platform

References

External links

Railway stations in Adelaide
Railway stations in Australia opened in 2014